Ivar Thomassen (19 July 1954 – 28 November 2016) was a Norwegian folk singer, songwriter, and jazz pianist .

Biography 
Thomassen was from Russenes in Porsanger, Norway. He lived in  Alta and taught at Alta high school. From 1989 to 1997,  he worked as district musician in Vadsø.  
Thomassen  composed and performed serious folk songs. Themes in these ballads have included the county and the region's nature, culture and history. Songs like Imella multebær og mygg  and Det artige landet  are frequently performed by local choirs and are well known among people from Finnmark. Thomassen was also active as a pianist in big bands and jazz ensembles, and contributed with his own compositions in this context. He did school concerts, arranged music, composed choral works and gave piano lessons. Thomassen lived in Alta and taught at the program for music, dance and drama at Alta High School. He also wrote the youth book Operasjon kråkereir.

Discography 
 2003: Attmed Havet (Nordisc)
 2011:Særlig Når Timan E Blå (Reflect)

Bibliography 
 2006: Attmed havet (Trane forlag) sheet music paperback
 2007: Operasjon kråkereir (Trane forlag)

References

External links 
 SPELT – Visekubben i Tromsø at Viser.no 

1954 births
2016 deaths
People from Porsanger
Musicians from Finnmark
Norwegian jazz pianists
Norwegian children's writers
Norwegian songwriters
Norwegian schoolteachers
Norwegian-language singers
Norwegian folk musicians